"My Heart Is Lost to You" is a song written by Connie Harrington and Brett Beavers, and recorded by American country music duo Brooks & Dunn.  It was released in April 2002 as the fourth single from their album Steers & Stripes.  It peaked at number 5 on the Billboard Hot Country Songs chart.

Music video
The music video takes place in a desert with two cars, and a man and a woman dancing. The video was directed by Shaun Silva.

Chart positions
"My Heart Is Lost to You" debuted at number 57 on the U.S. Billboard Hot Country Singles & Tracks chart for the week of April 13, 2002.

Year-end charts

References

2002 singles
2001 songs
Brooks & Dunn songs
Music videos directed by Shaun Silva
Songs written by Brett Beavers
Arista Nashville singles
Song recordings produced by Mark Wright (record producer)
Songs written by Connie Harrington